The 1966 All-Ireland Senior Camogie Championship Final was the 35th All-Ireland Final and the deciding match of the 1966 All-Ireland Senior Camogie Championship, an inter-county camogie tournament for the top teams in Ireland.

Antrim were their own worst enemies, hitting sixteen wides (against five by Dublin), and they list by two. This was Dublin's tenth championship in a row, and would prove to be their last for eighteen years.

References

All-Ireland Senior Camogie Championship Finals
Camogie
All-Ireland Senior Camogie Championship Final
All-Ireland Senior Camogie Championship Final
All-Ireland Senior Camogie Championship Final, 1966
Dublin county camogie team matches